{{Infobox radio station
| name             = WIBW
| logo             =
| logo_size        = 
| city             = Topeka, Kansas
| area             = Topeka metropolitan area
| branding         = 580 WIBW
| airdate          = 1925
| frequency        = 580 kHz
| translator       = 104.9 K285GL (Topeka)
| format           = Talk/sports
| power            = 5,000 watts
| class            = B
| facility_id      = 63169
| coordinates      =
| callsign_meaning = None (sequentially assigned)| former_callsigns = 
| owner            = Alpha Media
| licensee         = Alpha Media Licensee LLC
| sister_stations  = KSAJ, KTPK, WIBW-FM
| webcast          = Listen Live
| website          = 580wibw.com
| affiliations     = CBS News RadioFox News RadioCompass Media NetworksPremiere NetworksRadio AmericaKansas City Royals
}}

WIBW (580 kHz) is a commercial AM radio station in Topeka, Kansas. It is owned by Alpha Media and airs a talk and sports radio format. The studios and offices are on SW Executive Drive in Topeka.  The transmitter is off NW Landon Road in Silver Lake.

WIBW is simulcast on 250 watt FM translator station K285GL at 104.9 MHz.

Signal
WIBW transmits at 5,000 watts around the clock. A single non-directional tower is used during the day, and due to WIBW's low transmitting frequency, plus Kansas's flat terrain and excellent ground conductivity, the station has an unusually large daytime coverage area, covering a majority of Kansas, with distant and fringe coverage encompassing 11 other states, making it one of the largest radio signals in America. "Local" coverage includes Topeka, Emporia, west central Missouri including the Kansas City metropolitan area, and lower southeastern Nebraska. "Distant" coverage includes most of southern and central Kansas, including Hays, Great Bend, and Wichita, as well as southwestern portions of Iowa. "Fringe" coverage extends into the states of Texas, Arkansas, Illinois, Oklahoma, South Dakota, Minnesota, Colorado,and New Mexico.

At night a two-tower array directional antenna is used, which sends a majority of the signal westward, but still delivering a secondary signal to the Kansas City area. At night the station's signal can be heard in Kansas, Nebraska, Missouri, and parts of Oklahoma.

Programming
WIBW features both local and nationally syndicated talk shows. Weekdays begin with AG Issues, a morning agricultural and news show with Greg Akagi. Middays feature national shows from Brian Kilmeade and Dave Ramsey. In afternoons, Mic'd Up with Jake Lebahn and Fulton Caster is heard, followed by 580 SportsTalk with Brendan Dzwierzynski and Dan Lucero. Nights include a replay of Dave Ramsey along with Chad Benson. Coast to Coast AM with George Noory is heard overnight, with This Morning, America's First News with Gordon Deal airing before dawn. Weekends feature specialty shows on gardening, real estate and home repair. Most hours begin with world and national news from CBS Radio News, with state news coming from the Kansas State News Network.

The station features extensive coverage of local high school sports, as well as Kansas State University (KSU) athletics. WIBW is a network affiliate of the Kansas City Royals baseball team.

History
Early years
On July 24, 1925, WIBW first signed on the air.  It was owned by Dr. Lawrence L. Dill of Logansport, Indiana."Logansport Opens New Radio Station", Indianapolis Star, August 1, 1925, p. 3.  Dill operated the station along with his business partner, Donald Harrell.

In late 1926, the station was acquired by C. L. Carrell of Chicago, who converted it into a portable broadcasting station.  It joined a roster of seven stations controlled by Carrell. Portable stations could be transported from place-to-place on movable platforms such as trucks. These were generally hired out for a few weeks at a time to theaters, mostly located in small midwestern towns that didn't have their own radio stations, to be used for special programs broadcast to the local community. (Regulating "moving targets" proved difficult, so in May 1928 the Federal Radio Commission announced it was ending the licensing of portable facilities.)

WIBW's time as a portable station was brief. In early February 1927 it began broadcasting from the Connor Hotel in Joplin, Missouri.  It was still under the management of Donald Harrell. However, on Mother's Day, May 8, it began transmitting under the sponsorship of the Topeka Daily Capital from the Jayhawk Theatre. The studios were located at Tenth and Kansas streets. The debut program, organized by Y.M.C.A. secretary Lyle O. Armel, was described as a benefit for "Flood Sufferers Through Red Cross".

On January 31, 1929, ownership was transferred from C. L. Carrell to the Topeka Broadcasting Association, Inc.  It was organized by United States Senator Arthur Capper, who also owned the Capital. Capper died in 1951. In 1957, his family sold the Daily Capital and WIBW AM-TV to Stauffer Publications, owner of Topeka's other newspaper, the Topeka State Journal. WIBW's main studios for decades were located on Wanamaker Road in west Topeka, near the Menninger Clinic.  The programming there included live country music at 6:00 a.m. as late as the 1970s. The building housing those studios was severely damaged by fire January 5, 2012.

TV and FM stations
Stauffer Publications added a television station in 1953, WIBW-TV. It was one of the earliest TV stations to go on the air in Kansas. Because WIBW Radio was a CBS affiliate, WIBW-TV primarily became a CBS television network affiliate as well, although in its early days, it also carried programs from NBC, ABC and the DuMont Television Network.

In 1961, WIBW-FM signed on the air at 97.3 MHz. In its early days, it mostly simulcasted WIBW (AM). By the 1970s, it switched to album rock and later Top 40 hits, before going to country music in 1990. It moved to 94.5 MHz in 2002, to allow a new FM station to go on the air in the Kansas City radio market. In 1997, WIBW-AM-FM were acquired by Morris Communications, while WIBW-TV was bought by Gray Communications.  WIBW-AM-FM were acquired by Alpha Media in the 2010s.

Sharing time
Beginning in 1929, WIBW was required to share time on 580 kHz with Kansas State University's radio station KSAC (later KKSU), broadcasting in Manhattan, Kansas. Under the terms of the shared time agreement, the university station was on the air during afternoons, with WIBW broadcasting the other times of the day. While it was common for stations to share frequencies in the early days of radio, what was unusual was that this arrangement lasted for over seventy years. WIBW made several attempts to acquire full time operation on the frequency, especially after 1957, when Oscar Stauffer bought the Daily Capital. Despite political pressure, KSAC/KKSU stayed on the air.

In December 2001, Kansas State decided to move its sports broadcasts to the Mid-America Ag Network (MAAN), after airing them on WIBW continuously since 1969 and off-and-on since the 1950s. WIBW countered that a 1969 amendment to the timeshare agreement had granted WIBW the right to broadcast Wildcat football in exchange for allowing KKSU (then still KSAC) to extend its operating hours by 15 minutes each weekday. After long negotiations, WIBW's parent company Morris Communications agreed to update the arrangement in exchange for full use of the broadcasting hours. This resulted in WIBW buying KKSU's timeslot for $1.5 million, in addition to transferring exclusive rights to all Wildcat sporting events to MAAN. KKSU's final day of broadcasting was November 27, 2002.

Royals and Jayhawks
In 1969, the Kansas City Royals baseball team began playing, with WIBW carrying the games. In the Royals' early years, WIBW was considered the flagship station for the team's radio chain. WIBW is one of the few stations which has broadcast Royals games continuously since the franchise's first season.

In 2006, WIBW became the Topeka outlet for Kansas Jayhawks football and men's basketball games. On June 14, 2014, the Capital-Journal'' reported that WIBW would end its pact with the University of Kansas. The station renewed its University of Kansas affiliation in 2016, although the Jayhawks broadcasts subsequently moved to KMAJ and KWIC-FM.

Former hosts
 Mitch Holthus, radio announcer for the Kansas City Chiefs
 Jim Doblin, now president of JD Productions.

See also
 WIBW-TV
 WIBW-FM

Notes

References

External links
  (wibwnewsnow.com)

 (covering 1927–1980)

µ
News and talk radio stations in the United States
Sports radio stations in the United States
Radio stations established in 1925
Alpha Media radio stations